Friedelsheim is an Ortsgemeinde – a municipality belonging to a Verbandsgemeinde, a kind of collective municipality – in the Bad Dürkheim district in Rhineland-Palatinate, Germany.

Geography

Location 
The winegrowing centre lies in the eastern Palatinate (Vorderpfalz). It belongs to the Verbandsgemeinde of Wachenheim, whose seat is in the like-named town.

History 
On 24 June 770, Friedelsheim had its first documentary mention.

Politics

Municipal council 
The council is made up of 16 council members, who were elected at the municipal election held on 7 June 2009, and the honorary mayor as chairman.

The municipal election held on 7 June 2009 yielded the following results:

Coat of arms 
The German blazon reads: Eine vor blauem Hintergrund abgebildete  silberne Burg mit offenem Tor und drei Türmen mit spitzen roten Dächern, gekrönt von je einer goldenen Wetterfahne.

The municipality's arms might in English heraldic language be described thus: Azure a castle argent with an open gate and three towers each with a pointed roof gules crowned by a weathervane Or.

The arms are based on an old municipal seal, first known to have been used in 1698. The arms were officially conferred on 17 September 1853.

Culture and sightseeing

Regular events 
On the third Sunday in August, the Friedelsheimer Weinkerwe – the wine fair – is held.
On the second day of Advent, a Christmas market is held at the Protestant church.

Economy and infrastructure

Transport 
The Autobahn A 650 to Ludwigshafen links Friedelsheim to the national highway network. Towards Bad Dürkheim runs Bundesstraße 37.

The Rhein-Haardtbahn, a narrow-gauge railway running from Mannheim to Bad Dürkheim, also affords a link to the rail network.

Famous people

Sons and daughters of the town 
 Christian Philipp Koester (1784–1851), painter and restorer
 Jakob Latscha (1849–1912), businessman
 Ethelbert Stauffer (1902–1979), theologian

References

External links 
 Municipality’s official webpage 

Bad Dürkheim (district)